The 1925 European Wrestling Championships were held in Milan (Italy) in 1925 under the organization of the International Federation of Associated Wrestling (FILA) and the Italian Wrestling Federation. It only competed in the Greco-Roman style categories.

Medal table

Medal summary

Men's Greco-Roman

References

External links
FILA Database

1925 in European sport
Sports competitions in Italy